The Mara River is a river in Nunavut which flows into the Burnside River to empty into Bathurst Inlet on the Arctic Ocean.

See also
List of rivers of Nunavut

Rivers of Kitikmeot Region